The Geelong Football Netball League is an Australian rules football and netball league in Victoria, Australia. It is widely regarded as the highest standard Australian rules football league in regional Victoria, with several former AFL players now playing for a variety of clubs.

History
The league was formed in 1979 when twelve clubs broke away from the Geelong & District Football League. The city and country clubs of the old GDFL were divided into the major league competition of the GFL and the minor league of the GDFL. Many of the teams in the lower league wanted a system of promotion and relegation, which was fought by the GFL until the early 1980s when the Victorian Country Football League held a hearing in Melbourne. As a result, a trial promotion-relegation system was put into place on a voluntary basis. Today, the GDFL is opposed to the promotion-relegation system, with a three-division, three league competition of the Geelong FL, Bellarine FL and Geelong & District FL in place in the Geelong region.

Clubs

Current clubs

Former clubs

Premiers

Senior football

A Grade netball

Individual awards

Senior football

Mathieson Medal 
The Don Mathieson Medal is presented to the league's best and fairest player at the conclusion of the home-and-away season. It is named after Don Mathieson , who founded the league in 1979. Two players have won the award on three occasions: John Williams for Barwon and St Mary's across four seasons in the late 1980s, and Newtown & Chilwell's Matthew McMahon in consecutive seasons in the late 2010s. The award has been shared on eight occasions, most notably during a four-way tie in 1995.

Leading Goalkicker Award 
The Leading Goalkicker Award is presented to the player who has kicked the most goals at the conclusion of the home-and-away season.

A Grade netball

Best & Fairest Award

Hot Shot Award

Notes

References

External links
 Official website

 
Australian rules football competitions in Victoria (Australia)
Netball leagues in Victoria (Australia)